Györgyi Szakács is a Hungarian costume designer.

Awards
1998: Kossuth Prize
1986: Jászai Mari Award

References

Hungarian costume designers
Year of birth missing (living people)
Living people